Igreja da Graça may refer to:

 Igreja da Graça (Coimbra)
 Igreja da Graça (Santarém)
 Igreja da Graça (Évora)